The JGR Class 8900 was a type of 4-6-2 steam locomotive type formerly used in Japan by the Japanese Government Railways (JGR). The locomotives were built by the American Locomotive Company in the USA. They were the first 4-6-2 Pacific types used in Japan. They were numbered 8900-8935 they remained in service until 1957 when they were scrapped. And none are preserved.

See also
 Japan Railways locomotive numbering and classification
JNR Class C51

References

4-6-2 locomotives
Steam locomotives of Japan
1067 mm gauge locomotives of Japan
Passenger locomotives
Scrapped locomotives